Tadeusz Gawin (born 3 July 1951 in Łosośno near Hrodna) is a Belarusian Polish journalist and activist. He is co-founder and first President of the Union of Poles in Belarus from 1990 to 2000, now Honorary President of the UPB and activist of the democratic opposition in Belarus.

References

1951 births
Living people
People from Hrodna District
Soviet military personnel
Soviet people of Polish descent
Belarusian people of Polish descent
Belarusian journalists
Union of Poles in Belarus